The Museum of the Monastery of Gonia is a museum in Chania, Crete, Greece.

References

External links
Hellenic Ministry of Culture and Tourism
www.ecrete.gr
www.crete.tournet.gr
www.imks.gr (in Greek)

Museums in Chania
Religious museums in Greece